LaSalle Catholic College is an independent Roman Catholic comprehensive co-educational secondary day school, located in Bankstown, a south-western suburb of Sydney, New South Wales, Australia. The De La Salle Brothers run the college in the tradition of Saint John Baptist de La Salle.

The college provides a Catholic and general education for students from Year 7 to Year 12, with oversight provided by the Catholic Education Office of the Archdiocese of Sydney.

History
LaSalle Catholic College was formed in 1999. It is an amalgamation of three previous schools that existed on the site  - De La Salle College (7-10) (1951–1998), Benilde College (11-12) (1968–1999), and Nazareth Senior Girls College (11-12). Both Benilde and De La Salle were run by the De La Salle Brothers whilst Nazareth College was run by the Josephite sisters in the tradition of Blessed Mary McKillop. There are no longer Josephite sisters at the college, but several De La Salle Brothers still work at the College and live in the nearby Brothers' Residence.

In 2016, LaSalle Catholic College transitioned from single-sex (boys only) to co-ed with facilities upgraded to accommodate this change.

Campus
LaSalle Catholic College is located on a single campus in Bankstown. The college is located near the Hume Highway and occupies a fairly large site which forms part of the Catholic Parish of Saint Felix, Bankstown. The College has expanded significantly since 1999, with new facilities built as well as upgrading of existing ones.

The Saint Yon Trade Training Centre, which delivers vocational training to students was opened in 2013, at a cost of $7 million. The training facility is shared with a number of catholic schools in Sydney, including De La Salle Catholic College Cronulla, Aquinas Catholic College Menai and Casimir Catholic College Marrickville.

The LaSalle 'Heart Building' project, which commenced in 2019, saw the development of a new multi-purpose complex with pedestrian links to neighbouring buildings. The multi-purpose complex delivered under the project includes an expanded gymnasium, a 200-seat lecture theatre, a dance studio and a VET healthcare room. The project was completed in April 2021, at a cost of $11.3 million.

Co-curriculum

Houses

Sport
LaSalle Catholic College competes in the Sydney Catholic Schools Sport, an inter-school sporting competition for Catholic schools in Sydney. Sports offered include athletics, basketball, netball, soccer, swimming and touch football. LaSalle was previously affiliated with the Metropolitan Catholic Colleges Sports Association (MCC).

Notable alumni
Mike Bailey – former weatherman for Australian Broadcasting Corporation (also attended De La Salle College Ashfield)
Michael Hatton – former Australian Labor Party member of the Australian House of Representatives, representing the Division of Blaxland, New South Wales 
Jamal Idris – former National Rugby League player
Paul Keating – former Prime Minister of Australia
Ken Moroney – former Commissioner of the New South Wales Police Force
Brent Sherwin – former National Rugby League player

See also 

 List of Catholic schools in New South Wales
 Catholic education in Australia
 Lasallian educational institutions

References

External links 
LaSalle Catholic College website

Bankstown, New South Wales
Lasallian schools in Australia
Catholic secondary schools in Sydney
Educational institutions established in 1999
Metropolitan Catholic Colleges Sports Association
1999 establishments in Australia